Willow Springs International Motorsports Park (commonly referred to as Willow Springs) is located in Willow Springs near Rosamond, California, about  north of Los Angeles. It is the oldest permanent road course in the United States. Construction began in 1952, with the inaugural race held on November 23, 1953. The elevation changes and high average speeds make it a favorite of many road racing drivers.

Willow Springs hosted two NASCAR Grand National races in 1956 and 1957 on the original road course (then known simply as Willow Springs Speedway), won by Chuck Stevenson and Marvin Panch respectively. The track also hosted five NASCAR Winston West Series events, the first two in 1955 and 1956 and the other three between 1984 and 1986. Willow Springs also hosted one NASCAR Southwest Series race in 1986.

There are a total of seven tracks at Willow Springs.  The largest and most well known track is Willow Springs International Raceway (commonly referred to as Big Willow). There are other racing facilities such as The Streets of Willow (1.800 mile road course), The Horse Thief Mile (road course), The Speedway at Willow Springs (1/4 mile paved oval), Willow Springs Kart Track (a .625-mile, nine-turn paved sprint track), The Playpen (a 1/4-mile paved training track), and the Walt James Stadium (Clay Oval and Paved Oval).

Efforts by fans resulted in the State of California declaring Willow Springs International Raceway as a California Point of Historical Interest in 1996.

Tracks

Willow Springs Raceway  

Willow Springs Raceway (commonly called Big Willow or sometimes The Big Track) is a  paved road course consisting of 9 turns.

Turn 1: "Castrol corner" is a 90-degree high-speed left-handed turn.
Turn 2: "The Rabbits Ear" is a double apex sweeping turn
Turn 3/4: "The Omega" is an uphill and downhill section with a camber change.
Turn 5: A quick left-handed turn that sets up for the fastest sections of the track.
Turn 6: Monroe Ridge
Turn 7: Repass Pass
Turn 8: Sometimes called, "The Sweeper," turn 8 is a high speed right hand corner. The lead-in to this turn is the fastest section of the racetrack. 
Turn 9: A right-handed turn with a big dip before the apex. This is the final turn before the front straightway to the finish line.

The Streets of Willow Springs
The Streets of Willow Springs (commonly called The Streets of Willow or sometimes Streets) is a  paved roadcourse. The track was repaved in late 2021 after numerous complaints of the deteriorating quality of the track.

Horse Thief Mile
Opened in 2003, the Horse Thief Mile (sometimes called The Mile) is a  paved roadcourse featuring 11 turns as well as numerous elevation changes. It was designed to simulate a winding mountain road.

Willow Springs Kart Track

Speedway Willow Springs

Walt James Stadium

Media

Willow Springs has been featured in numerous forms of media including movies, television, music videos and video games.

Willow Springs has been used for filming for numerous motion pictures including 1:42:08: A Man and His Car, the 1969 Disney film The Love Bug and Ford v Ferrari (Le Mans '66).

Willow Springs has been used for several TV shows including British BBC program Top Gear, several episodes of Wheeler Dealers and Jay Leno's Garage and many more.

The track was featured in the Japanese Best Motoring International "American Touge" video special.

The track is in the 1985 Christopher Cross music video "Every Turn of the World" as well as It's the Things You Do by Five

Willow Springs International Motorsports Park was the venue of a photoshoot session by Playboy for its Playmate pictorial and centerfold featuring Alyssa Arcè as Miss July 2013. The photographs were featured in the magazine's July–August 2013 issue.

Willow Springs tracks have been featured in video games including Need for Speed: ProStreet, Need for Speed: Shift, Gran Turismo 6, Gran Turismo Sport, Gran Turismo 7 and Project CARS

Track records
The overall track record is held by Michael Andretti in a 1987 CART Indycar.

Lap Records
The official fastest race lap records at Willow Springs International Motorsports Park are listed as:

Other motorsport
Option hosted an early exhibition drift event in 1996.

During the early 1980s, the factory-backed Renault Formula One team often used Willow Springs to test their cars before the early season United States Grand Prix West held at Long Beach in Los Angeles.

ChampCar Endurance Series hosts a double-8+7-hour endurance race on Big Willow.

Photographs

See also
 Buttonwillow Raceway Park

References

External links 
 Willow Springs Raceway Track Map Workbook
 Willow Springs International Raceway Official Site
 The Speedway At Willow Springs Official Site
 Willow Springs International Motorsports Park archive at Racing-Reference
 Google Images satellite view of raceway
Guide to Willow Springs Raceway

Sports venues in Kern County, California
Motorsport venues in California
Rosamond, California
NASCAR tracks
1953 establishments in California
Sports venues completed in 1953
Road courses in the United States